Marlene Dietrich's recording career spanned sixty years, from 1928 until 1988. She introduced the songs "Falling in Love Again (Can't Help It)" (from the film The Blue Angel) and "See What the Boys in the Back Room Will Have" (from "Destry Rides Again"). She first recorded her version of "Lili Marlene" in 1945.

Her first long-playing album was Marlene Dietrich Overseas, was a prestige success for Columbia Records in 1950. She also recorded several duets with Rosemary Clooney in the early 1950s: these tapped into a younger market and charted. During the 1960s, Dietrich recorded several albums and many singles, mostly with Burt Bacharach at the helm of the orchestra. Dietrich in London, recorded live at the Queen's Theatre in 1964, is an enduring document of Dietrich in concert.

In 1978, Dietrich's performance of the title track from her last film, Just a Gigolo, was issued as a single. She made her last recordings — spoken introductions to songs for a nostalgia album by Udo Lindenberg — from her Paris apartment in 1987.

Dietrich told Maximilian Schell in his documentary, Marlene (1984), that she thought Marlene singt Berlin-Berlin (1964) –  her interpretations of Berliner popular songs from the start of the 20th Century – was her best album.

Albums

Studio albums

Live albums

Compilation albums

Box sets

Video albums

Other
Hermine: Udo Lindenberg singt Lieder von 1929 bis 1988 (* Spoken verse introduction to Illusions and Wenn ich mir was wünschen dürfte)

Many of Dietrich's numerous radio performances have been included on compilations of her music.

The Polish label Wifon issued a cassette tape of a Dietrich concert, recorded in Warsaw in 1966, in 1992 (catalogue number MC283). The release contained the following tracks: "I Can't Give You Anything But Love, Baby", "You're the Cream in my Coffee", "My Blue Heaven", "See What the Boys in the Backroom Will Have", "The Laziest Gal in Town", "Shir Hatan", "La Vie en Rose", "Jonny", "Go 'Way From My Window", "Don't Smoke in Bed", "Lola", "Marie–Marie" and "Frag nicht warum ich gehe".

A limited special edition of the book Photographs and Memories (published in 2001 by Nicolai, Berlin) included a recording of the soundtrack of Dietrich's 1963 filmed concert at Berns Salonger as an audio CD bonus.

The Marlene Dietrich Collection Berlin's archival holdings include soundtrack prerecording discs and unissued radio and concert recordings.
 
The following of Dietrich's studio recordings remain unreleased: "Du, du liegst mir im Herzen", "Aus der Jugendzeit", "Das zerbrochene Ringlein",  "Treue Liebe" (all recorded July 1954 with Jimmy Carroll and  orchestra) and "Wot cher! [Knocked 'Em In the Old Kent Road]" (recorded in 1955 with Wally Stott and orchestra).

Singles: 1928 - 1954
Recordings first issued on 78 rpm records:

Singles: 1957 – 1978
Recordings first issued as 7" (45 rpm, except where noted otherwise) singles:

OSS Recordings (1944–1945)
Dietrich recorded the following tracks in Washington in 1944 – 1945 for OSS use:

 "Mein Mann ist verhindert"
 "Sag mir Adieu"
 "Ich hab' die ganze Nacht geweint"
 "Gib doch den Männern am Stammtisch ihr Gift"
 "Wo die Wiesen sind"
 "Fräulein Annie wohnt schon lang nicht hier"
 "Schlittenfahrt"
 "Nun kam die Erntezeit"
 "Du hast 'nen Blick"
 "Ich Heirate Nie"
 "Lili Marleen"

These recordings were not meant for commercial issue. "Gib doch den Männern am Stammtisch ihr Gift", "Ich Heirate Nie" and "Du hast 'nen Blick" were issued for the first time in 2001 on Der Blonde Engel (EMI 7242 5 27567 2 7). All the other tracks remain unissued, with the partial exception of "Lili Marleen". With its massive success on the war front, specifically on the German language OSS MO radio station "Soldatensender", where it became the station's theme song, the song was re-recorded in English and released, with the spelling "Lili Marlene", as a 10" single by Decca in 1945. Though other recordings of the song in German were performed by Dietrich, the original OSS recording of the track is presumed unissued.

Soundtrack Performances (1929–1978)

Many of Dietrich's performances of songs in her films have been included in compilations of her music:
 
 "You're the Cream in my Coffee" (The Blue Angel Screen Test, 1929)
 "Wer wird denn weinen" (The Blue Angel Screen Test, 1929)
 "Ich bin die fesche Lola" (Der blaue Engel, 1930)
 "Nimm' Dich in acht vor blonden Frau’n" (Der blaue Engel, 1930)
 "Kinder, heut' abend, da such ich mir was aus (Der blaue Engel, 1930)
 "Ich bin von Kopf bis Fuß auf Liebe eingestellt" (Der blaue Engel, 1930)
 "Quand l'amour meurt" (Morocco, 1930)
 "What Am I Bid for my Apple?" (Morocco, 1930)
 "Blonde Women" (The Blue Angel, 1930)
 "Lola" (The Blue Angel, 1930)
 "This Evening, Children" (The Blue Angel, 1930)
 "Falling In Love Again" (The Blue Angel, 1930)
 "Hot Voodoo" (Blonde Venus, 1932)
 "I Couldn’t Be Annoyed" (Blonde Venus, 1932)
 "You Little-So-and-So" (Blonde Venus, 1932)
 "Heidenröslein" (Song of Songs, 1933)
 "Jonny" (Song of Songs, 1933)
 "Three Sweethearts Have I" (The Devil is a Woman, 1935)
 "Awake in a Dream" (Desire,  1936)
 "Little Joe, The Wrangler" (Destry Rides Again, 1939)
 "You've Got That Look" (Destry Rides Again, 1939)
 "See What the Boys in the Backroom Will Have" (Destry Rides Again, 1939)
 "I've Been In Love Before" (Seven Sinners, 1940)
 "The Man's in the Navy" (Seven Sinners, 1940)
 "Sweet Is the Blush of May" (The Flame of New Orleans, 1941)
 "He Lied and I Listened" (Manpower, 1941)
 "Strange Thing" (The Lady is Willing, 1942)
 "Tell Me, Tell Me, Evening Star" (Kismet, 1944)
 "Golden Earrings" (Golden Earrings, 1947)
 "Illusions" (A Foreign Affair, 1948)
 "Black Market" (A Foreign Affair, 1948)
 "The Ruins of Berlin" (A Foreign Affair, 1948)
 "La Vie en Rose" (Stage Fright, 1950)
 "The Laziest Gal in Town (Stage Fright, 1950)
 "Love is Lyrical" (Stage Fright, 1950)
 "Get Away, Young Man" (Rancho Notorious, 1952)
 "Gypsy Davey" (Rancho Notorious, 1952)
 "Les Jeux Sonts Faits" (The Monte Carlo Story, 1957)
 "Back Home Again in Indiana" (The Monte Carlo Story, 1957)
 "I May Never Go Home Anymore" (Witness for the Prosecution, 1958)
 "Just a Gigolo" (Just a Gigolo, 1978)

Selected songs introduced by Marlene Dietrich
1930: "Falling In Love Again"
1930: "Naughty Lola"
1930: "Blonde Women"
1932: "Hot Voodoo"
1932: "You Little So and So"
1936: "Awake in a Dream"
1939: "See What the Boys in the Back Room Will Have"
1939: "You've Got That Look"
1948: "Illusions"
1948: "Black Market"
1953: "Look Me Over Closely"
1962: "Cherche la Rose"
1964: "In den Kasernen"

References

External links
 

Discography
Discographies of American artists
Pop music discographies
Discographies of German artists